U of T may refer to:

Albania
 University of Tirana

Canada
 University of Toronto

Estonia
 University of Tartu

Iran
 University of Tehran

Japan
 University of Tokyo

Netherlands
 University of Twente, alternatively known as Universiteit Twente

Puerto Rico
 University of Turabo, alternatively known as Universidad del Turabo

United States
 University of Tampa
 University of Tennessee
 University of Texas
 University of Toledo
 University of Tulsa

See also
 UT (disambiguation)